Thomas Sweet (1 August 1851 – 17 March 1905) was a New Zealand cricketer. He played first-class cricket for Auckland and Canterbury between 1873 and 1877.

See also
 List of Auckland representative cricketers

References

External links
 

1851 births
1905 deaths
New Zealand cricketers
Auckland cricketers
Canterbury cricketers
Cricketers from Greater London